Wheelchair fencing is a version of fencing for athletes with a disability. Wheelchair fencing is governed by the International Wheelchair and Amputee Sports Federation that is a federation of the International Paralympic Committee, and is one of the sports in the Summer Paralympic Games. The Paralympic games take place every 4 years in different countries.

Classification
class A (athletes with full trunk movement and good balance)
class B (athletes with no leg movement and impaired trunk and balance functions)
class C (athletes with a disability in all four limbs, not included in the Paralympic games program)

Events

Paralympic Games

World Championships

European Championships

See also
Paralympic sport
Wheelchair fencing at the Summer Paralympics

References

External links

IWAS Wheelchair Fencing
Wheelchair Fencing on International Paralympic Committee website
Wheelchair fencing at the Paralympics